Wolfgang Kilian (1581–1662) was a German engraver and member of the Kilian family of engravers in Augsburg.

Biography
He was the son of Bartholomaus Kilian the elder and Maria Pfeiffelmann. After his father's death in 1583 his mother remarried Dominicus Custos and he and his brother Lucas became his pupils.

From 1604–1608 he travelled in Italy and worked in Venice, Mantua, and Milan. On his return he married and continued in the family workshop. He was the father of the engravers Bartholomaus the younger and Philipp.

References

Sources
Wolfgang Kilian on Artnet

External links
 

1581 births
1662 deaths
Kilian family